Toute une nuit (also known as A Whole Night and All Night Long) is a 1982 Belgian-French drama film  written and directed by Chantal Akerman. To celebrate the 30th anniversary of the Teddy Awards, the film was selected to be shown at the 66th Berlin International Film Festival in February 2016.

Plot

During a hot summer night in Brussels, Belgium several people are unable to fall asleep. They go out in the streets and/or visit a bar or a dance club to have some chance encounters that may or not lead to erotic contacts...

Cast 
 Aurore Clément 
 Tchéky Karyo 
 Jan Decorte
 Natalia Akerman
 Véronique Silver
 Samy Szlingerbaum
 Jan Decleir
 Frank Aendenboom
 Christiane Cohendy
 Ingrid De Vos

References

External links

1982 drama films
1982 films
Films directed by Chantal Akerman
Belgian drama films
French drama films
Films set in Brussels
1980s French-language films
French-language Belgian films
1980s French films